The Hôtel de Pourtalès is a historic hôtel particulier, a type of large townhouse of France,  at 7 rue Tronchet in the 8th arrondissement of Paris. It was designed by architect Félix Duban and built in 1839 for James-Alexandre de Pourtalès, a Swiss-born banker and art collector. It has been listed as an official historical monument since September 17, 2002.

The building is now operated as a luxurious apartment hotel. In October 2016, reality TV personality Kim Kardashian said that she was held at gunpoint and robbed of valuable jewelry by a group of assailants who gained access to her suite in the building.

References

External links

Pourtalès
Houses completed in 1839
Buildings and structures in the 8th arrondissement of Paris
Pourtalès family